Balvraid is a small remote settlement, located 8 miles south east of Inverness in Inverness-shire, Scottish Highlands and is in the Scottish council area of Highland.

References

Populated places in Inverness committee area